Turbonilla liufaui is a species of sea snail, a marine gastropod mollusk in the family Pyramidellidae, the pyrams and their allies.

Description
The length of the shell measures 1.6 mm.

Distribution
This marine shell occurs off the Solomon Islands.

References

External links
 To Encyclopedia of Life
 To World Register of Marine Species

liufaui
Gastropods described in 2010